Gallia Narbonensis (Latin for "Gaul of Narbonne", from its chief settlement) was a Roman province located in what is now Languedoc and Provence, in Southern France. It was also known as Provincia Nostra ("Our Province"), because it was the first Roman province north of the Alps, and as Gallia Transalpina ("Transalpine Gaul"), distinguishing it from Cisalpine Gaul in Northern Italy. It became a Roman province in the late 2nd century BC. Gallia Narbonensis was bordered by the Pyrenees Mountains on the west, the Cévennes to the north, the Alps on the east, and the Gulf of Lion on the south; the province included the majority of the Rhone catchment. The western region of Gallia Narbonensis was known as Septimania. The province was a valuable part of the Roman Empire, owing to the Greek colony of Massalia, its location between the Spanish provinces and Rome, and its financial output.

Names
The province of Gallia Transalpina ("Transalpine Gaul") was later renamed Gallia Narbonensis, after its newly established capital of Colonia Narbo Martius (colloquially known as Narbo, at the location of the modern Narbonne), a Roman colony founded on the coast in 118 BC. The name Gallia Narbonensis most likely originates in the Augustan era. Its first recorded use was in a census conducted by Gnaeus Pullius Pollio. The Romans had called it Provincia Nostra ("our province") or simply Provincia ("the province"). The term has survived in the modern name of Provence for the eastern part of the area (French Provence, Occitan Provença), now a region of France.

Founding
By the mid-2nd century BC, Rome was trading heavily with the Greek colony of Massalia (modern Marseille) on the southern coast of Gaul. Massalia, founded by colonists from Phocaea, was by this point centuries old and quite prosperous. Rome entered into an alliance with Massalia, by which it agreed to protect the town from local Gauls, nearby Aquitani, sea-borne Carthaginians and other rivals, in exchange for a small strip of land that it wanted in order to build a road to Hispania, to assist in troop transport. The Massalians, for their part, cared more for their economic prosperity than they did for territorial integrity.

During the war against Sertorius, Gallia Narbonensis was an important base for military activities. This was an important event in the Romanization of Narbonese Gaul, as it resulted in the Romans organizing the province.

During this period, the Mediterranean settlements on the coast were threatened by the powerful Gallic tribes to the north, especially the tribes known as the Arverni and the Allobroges. The area became a Roman province in 121 BC, following a great victory of the Roman general Quintus Fabius Maximus (later additionally named Allobrogicus), who had campaigned in the area and defeated the Allobroges and the Arverni under King Bituitus at the Isère River. This defeat substantially weakened the Arverni and ensured the further security of Gallia Narbonensis.

The province had come into Roman control originally under the name Gallia Transalpina (Transalpine Gaul), which distinguished it from Cisalpine Gaul on the near side of the Alps to Rome.

In this strip of land, the Romans founded the town of Narbonne in 118 BC. At the same time, they built the Via Domitia, the first Roman road in Gaul, connecting Gaul to Hispania, and the Via Aquitania, which led toward the Atlantic through Tolosa (Toulouse) and Burdigala (Bordeaux). Thus, the Romans built a crossroads that made Narbonne an optimal trading center, and Narbonne became a major trading competitor to Massalia.  From Narbonne, the Romans established the province of Transalpine Gaul, later called Gallia Narbonensis.

Later history
Control of the province, which bordered directly on Italia, gave the Roman state several advantages: control of the land route between Italy and the Iberian peninsula; a territorial buffer against Gallic attacks on Italy; and control of the lucrative trade routes of the Rhône valley between Gaul and the markets of Massalia. It was from the capital of Narbonne that Julius Caesar began his Gallic Wars. Caesar rebuilt Narbo and built the cities of Forum Julium and Arles. Julius Caesar also granted many communities in Gallia Narbonensis citizenship. In 49 BC, the city of Massalia sided with the Pompeians during the civil war. After the war ended, the city of Massalia lost all of its independence and was fully subject to Roman rule.

In 40 BC, during the Second Triumvirate, Lepidus was given responsibility for Narbonese Gaul (along with Hispania and Africa), while Mark Antony was given the balance of Gaul. After becoming Emperor, Augustus made Gallia Narbonensis a senatorial province governed by a proconsul. 

Emperor Diocletian's administrative reorganization of the Empire in  314 merged the provinces Gallia Narbonensis and Gallia Aquitania into a new administrative unit called Dioecesis Viennensis (Diocese of Vienne) with the capital more to the north in Vienne.  The new diocese's name was later changed to Dioecesis Septem Provinciarum (Diocese of the Seven Provinces), indicating that Diocletian had demoted the word "province" to mean a smaller subdivision than in traditional usage.

Galla Narbonensis and surrounding areas were incorporated into the Visigothic Kingdom between AD 462 and 477, permanently ending Roman political control. After the Gothic takeover, the Visigothic dominions were to be generally known as Septimania, while to the east of the lower Rhone the term Provence came into use.

List of Proconsular governors of Gallia Narbonensis 
(This list is based on A.L.F. Rivet, Gallia Narbonensis (London: Batsford, 1988), pp. 79, 86f.)

 Gnaeus Pullius Pollio—between 18 and 16 BC
 Marcus Cincius Saturninus –under Augustus
 Titedius Labeo—under Tiberius
 Manius Vibius Balbinus—15-17
 Torquatus Novellus Atticus—30-34
 Titus Mussidius Pollianus—34-37
 Titus Vinius—under Nero
 L. V[...]dius Bassus—c. 77
 Gaius Iulius Cornutus Tertullus—before 78
 Aulus Larcius Priscus—103-109
 Marcus Acilius Priscus Egrilius Plarianus—118-120
 Lucius Aninius Sextius Florentinus—c. 124
 Lucius Aurelius Gallus—124-127
 Lucius Novius Crispinus Martialis Saturninus—144-5
 Gaius Seius Calpurnius Quadratus Sittianus—before 150
 Lucius Cestius Gallus—between 165 and 183
 Gnaeus Cornelius Aquilius Niger—between 138 and 192
 Lucius Fabius Cilo Septiminus Catinius Acilianus Lepidus Fulcinianus—between 180 and 192
 ...]dius T.f.—2nd century
 Lucius Ranius Optatus Novatus—between 197 and 214
 Ignotus, allegedly killed for supporting Geta—c. 210
 ...]us—between 210 and 230
 Tiberius Claudius Paulinus—216-217
 Gaius Aemilius Berenicianus Maximus—between 222 and 235
 Iulianus—between 222 and 235
 C. Seius Calpurnius Quadratus Sittianus—middle 3rd century

Notes

References

Further reading
 

 
Provinces of Roman Gaul
History of Narbonne
Provence
Former countries in French history
121 BC
120s BC establishments
2nd-century BC establishments
2nd-century BC establishments in the Roman Republic
5th-century disestablishments
5th-century disestablishments in the Roman Empire
States and territories established in the 2nd century BC
States and territories disestablished in the 5th century
Provinces of the Roman Republic
France in the Roman era